AltGr (also Alt Graph) is a modifier key found on many computer keyboards (rather than a second Alt key found on US keyboards). It is primarily used to type characters that are not widely used in the territory where sold, such as foreign currency symbols, typographic marks and accented letters. On a typical Windows-compatible PC keyboard, the AltGr key, when present, takes the place of the right-hand Alt key. The key at this location will operate as AltGr if a keyboard layout using AltGr is chosen in the operating system, regardless of what is engraved on the key. In macOS, the Option key has functions similar to the AltGr key.

The AltGr key is used as an additional Shift key, to provide a third and a fourth (when Shift is also pressed) grapheme for most keys. Most are accented variants of the letters on the keys, but also additional symbols and punctuation marks. Some languages such as Bengali use this key when the number of letters of their alphabet is too large for a standard keyboard. For example, on the US-International keyboard layout, the  key can be used to insert four different characters:
  → c (lowercase — first level)
  → C (uppercase — second level)
  → © (copyright sign — third level)
  → ¢ (cent sign — fourth level)

History

IBM states that AltGr is an abbreviation for alternate graphic.

A key labelled with some variation of "Alt Graphic" was on many computer keyboards before the Windows international layouts. On early home computers the alternate graphemes were primarily box-drawing characters.

This likely was the intended purpose of the Alt key on PC keyboards, however software quickly used this as a combination key for shortcuts, requiring a new key for producing additional characters.

Ctrl+Alt
Because of this feature, Microsoft advises that  not be used as part of any application keyboard shortcut, as it would prevent typing the matching  character on such keyboards.

Function by default national keyboard
In most of the keyboard diagrams the symbol you get when holding down AltGr is in blue in the lower-right of the corner. If different, the symbol for Shift+AltGr is shown in the upper-right.

Bangladesh

Belgium 

The Windows version of the Belgian keyboard may only support a subset of these characters. Several of the AltGr combinations are themselves dead keys, which are followed by another letter to produce an accented version of that letter.

Brazil

Some notes 
 The  combination results in the (obsolete) symbol ₢ for the former Brazilian currency, the Brazilian cruzeiro.
 Some software (e.g.

France 
On AZERTY keyboards, AltGr enables the user to type the following characters:

Germany 
On German keyboards, AltGr enables the user to type the following characters, which are indicated on the keyboard:

Windows 8 introduced the ability of pressing  to produce ẞ (capital ß). Even though this is usually not indicated on the physical keyboard—potentially due to a lack of space, since the ß-key already has three different levels ( → "ß",  → "?", and, as shown above,  → "\")—, it can be seen in the Windows On-Screen Keyboard by selecting the necessary keys with the German keyboard layout selected. Some newer types of German keyboards offer the assignment  → capital ß.

Greece 

Some of these key combinations also result in different characters if the polytonic layout is used.

Israel

Hebrew
On Hebrew keyboards, AltGr enables the user to type the Hebrew vowels and pronunciation marks.
In addition, there are several combinations for special characters:

  → €
  → ₪
  → °
  → ֫
  → ֽ
  → ×
  → LRM
  → RLM
  → ־
  → –
  → ÷
 ‎ → ”
 ‎ → “
 ‎ → „
 ‎ → ’
 ‎ → ‘
 ‎ → ‚
  → ׳
  → ״
 ‎ → ׆

Yiddish 
Using a Hebrew keyboard, one may write in Yiddish as the two languages share many letters. However, Yiddish has some additional digraphs not otherwise found in Hebrew, which are entered via AltGr:

 ‎ → 
 ‎ → 
 ‎ →

Italy 

On Italian keyboards, AltGr enables the user to type the following characters:

  → €
  → €
  → @
  → #

  → [
  → ]
  → {
  → }

There is an alternate layout, which differ just in disposition of characters accessible through AltGr and includes the tilde and the curly brackets.

Latvia 
The following letters can be input in the Latvian keyboard layout using AltGr:

Lowercase letters 
  → ā
  → č
  → ē
  → ģ
  → ī
  → ķ
  → ļ
  → ņ
  → ō
  → ŗ
  → š
  → ū
  → ž

Uppercase letters 
  → Ā
  → Č
  → Ē
  → Ģ
  → Ī
  → Ķ
  → Ļ
  → Ņ
  → Ō
  → Ŗ
  → Š
  → Ū
  → Ž

North Macedonia 
On Macedonian keyboards, AltGr enables the user to type the following characters:

  → €
  → Ђ
  → ђ
  → [

  → ]
  → Ћ
  → ћ
  → @

  → {
  → }
  → §

The Netherlands 

 Digits row
  → ¹ and ¡
  → ²
  → ³
  → £ and ¤
  → €
  → ¼
  → ½
  → ¾
  → ‘
  → ’
  → ¥
  → × and ÷
 Top letters row
  → ä and Ä
  → å and Å
  → é and É
  → ®
  → þ and Þ (Icelandic and Old English thorn)
  → ü and Ü
  → ú and Ú
  → í and Í
  → ó and Ó
  → ö and Ö
  → «
  → »
  → ¬ and ¦
 Middle letters row (Home row)
  → á and Á
  → ß (German eszett aka sharp s) and §
  → ð and Ð (Icelandic edh)
  → ø and Ø
  → ¶ and °
  → ´ and ¨
 Bottom letters row
  → æ and Æ
  → © and ¢
  → ñ and Ñ
  → µ
  → ç and Ç
  → ¿

Nordic countries and Estonia 
The keyboard layouts in the Nordic countries Denmark (DK), Faroe Islands (FO), Finland (FI), Norway (NO) and Sweden (SE) as well as in Estonia (EE) are largely similar to each other. Generally the AltGr key can be used to create the following characters:

  → @
  → £
  → $
  → €
  → µ

  → {
  → [
  → ]
  → }
  → ~ (excluding EE)

Other AltGr combinations are peculiar to just some of the countries:

  → \ (EE, FI, SE)
  → | (EE, FI, SE)
  → \ (DK, FO)
  → | (DK, FO)
  → ´ (NO)
  → ~ (FO)
  → ¨ (FO)

  → ^ (FO)
  → € (NO, DK, FO, SE, sometimes FI)
  → š (EE, sometimes FI)
  → ž (EE, sometimes FI)
  → § (EE)
  → ½ (EE)

Finnish multilingual 
The Finnish multilingual keyboard standard adds many new characters to the traditional layout via the AltGr key, as shown in the image below (the blue characters can be written with the AltGr key; several dead key diacritics, shown in red, are also available as an AltGr combination).

Poland 
Typewriters in Poland used a QWERTZ layout specifically designed for the Polish language with accented letters in the Polish alphabet obtainable directly. When personal computers became available worldwide in the 1980s, commercial importing into Poland was not supported by its communist government, so most machines in Poland were brought in by private individuals. Most had US keyboards, and various methods were devised to make available the accented Polish letters. An established method was to configure the rightAlt key as an AltGr key and to use it in combination with a Latin base letter to obtain the equivalent precomposed character (accented form of the letter). 
  → ą
  → ć
  → ę
  → ł
  → ń
  → ó
  → ś
  → €
  → ź 
  → ż
(Because there are two types of "z with diacritic" ( and ),  is a special case.)

At the time of the Fall of communism and opening of commercial import channels this practice was so widespread that it was adopted as the de facto standard. Nowadays nearly all PCs in Poland have standard US keyboards and use the AltGr method to enter Polish diacritics. This keyboard mapping is referred to as the Polish programmers' layout or simply Polish layout.

Another layout is still used on typewriters, mostly by professional typists. Computer keyboards with this layout are available, though difficult to find, and supported by a number of operating systems; they are known as Polish typists' layout. Older Polish versions of Microsoft Windows used this layout, describing it as Polish layout. On current versions it is referred to as Polish (214).

Romania 

The keymap with the AltGr key:

  â  ß  €  r  ț  y  u  î  o  §  „  ”
   ă  ș  đ  f  g  h  j  k  ł  ;
     z  x  ©  v  b  n  m  «  »

Russia 
Since release 1903, versions of Windows 10 have the binding:
  → ₽ (Ruble sign)

South Slavic Latin and Czech keyboards
On South Slavic Latin (used in Croatia, Slovenia, Bosnia and Herzegovina, Montenegro and Serbia) and on Czech keyboards, the following letters and special characters are created using AltGr:

  → \
  → |
  → €
  → ÷
  → ×
  → [
  → ]
  → ł
  → Ł
  → ß

  → ¤
  → @
  → {
  → }
  → §
  → <
  → >
  → ~
  → ˇ
  → ^

  → ˘
  → °
  → ˛
  → `
  → ˙
  → ´
  → ˝
  → ¨
  → ¸

South Slavic cyrillic keyboards use a different layout.

Switzerland 
On Swiss keyboards, AltGr in combination with the following keys types the following characters:

  → ¦
  → @
  → #
  → °

  → §
  → ¬
  → |
  → ¢

  → \
  → €
  → ´  (dead key)
  → ~  (dead key)

  /  → [  (See explanation below)
  → ]
  /  → {  (See explanation below)
  → }

Switzerland has three national Languages (German, French and Italian). The Swiss keyboard layout is therefore designed with compatibility in mind for all three languages. In regions where German is spoken, the Swiss German layout will be used, where the OEM5 key will type an ). In French regions the Swiss French layout will be used where OEM5 will type .

Swiss German:  → {

Swiss French:  → {

Turkey 
In Turkish keyboard variants the AltGr can be used to display the following characters:

  → æ
  → ß
  → €
  → ₺
  → @
  → i
  a → ã
  a → ä
  a → á
  a → à

United Kingdom and Ireland 

  → á and Á
  → é and É
  → í and Í
  → ó and Ó
  → ú and Ú

  → €
  → \
  → ¦

In UK and Ireland keyboard layouts, only two alternative use symbols are printed on most keyboards, which require the AltGr key to function. These are:
 € the euro sign. Located on the "4/$" key.
 ¦ the broken bar symbol.  Located on the "`/¬" key, to the immediate left of "1".

Using the AltGr key on Linux produces many foreign characters and international symbols, e.g. ¹²³€½{[]}@łe¶ŧ←↓→øþæßðđŋħjĸł«»¢“”nµΩŁE®Ŧ¥↑ıØÞÆ§ÐªŊĦJ&Ł<>©‘’Nº×÷· (If reconfigured as a compose key, an even larger repertoire is available). 

With the UK extended keyboard setting (below), ChromeOS offers a large repertoire of symbols and precomposed characters.

Scotland and Wales
For the diacritics used by Welsh (ŵ and ŷ) and Scottish Gaelic (à, è, ì, ò and ù), the UK extended keyboard setting is needed.

UK extended keyboard layout
The UK-Extended keyboard mapping (available with Microsoft Windows, Linux and ChromeOS) allows many characters with diacritical marks (including those used in other European countries) to be generated by using the AltGr key or dead keys in combination with others.

Notes: Dotted circle (◌) is used here to indicate a dead key. The  (grave accent) key is the only one that acts as a free-standing dead key and thus does not respond as shown on the key-cap. All others are invoked by AltGr. 
 (°) is a degree sign;   (º) is a masculine ordinal indicator. For a complete list of the characters available using dead keys, see QWERTY#ChromeOS.

United States 
Most keyboards sold in the US do not have an (engraved)  key. However, if there is an right-hand  key it will act as  if a layout using it is installed (conversely a foreign keyboard  will act like the right-hand  if the standard US keyboard layout is installed).

US-International

Microsoft provides a US-International keyboard layout that uses  (or right-hand  or ) key to produce more characters:

Other operating systems such as Linux and ChromeOS follow this layout but increase the repertoire of glyphs provided.

X Window System 
In the X Window System (Linux, BSD, Unix), AltGr can often be used to produce additional characters with almost every key on the keyboard. 
Furthermore, with some keys, AltGr will produce a dead key; for example on a UK keyboard, semicolon can be used to add an acute accent to a base letter, and left square bracket can be used to add a trema:
  followed by  → é
  followed by  → Ö

This use of dead keys enables one to type a wide variety of precomposed characters that combine various diacritics with either uppercase or lowercase letters, achieving a similar effect to the Compose key.

Keyboard maps

Below are some diagrams and examples of country-specific key maps.

Danish keyboard

The Danish keymap features the following key combinations:
  → Ω
  → ø
  → µ

Italian keyboard
The Italian keymap includes, among other combinations, the following:

  → ħ
  → ~

  → `
  → ×

Norwegian keyboard

Swedish keyboard

See also 
 Modifier key
 Option key
 Shift key
 Dead key
 Escape character
 Compose key
 Windows Alt keycodes
 Precomposed character

References 

Computer keys